L'Oiseau Bleu (or the Oiseau Bleu) was an international express train linking Antwerp with Paris. The train was named after the play L'Oiseau Bleu as a tribute to its author, the Belgian Nobel prize laureate Maurice Maeterlinck.

Wagon-Lits Pullman train
The Oiseau Bleu started as a luxury train operated by the Compagnie Internationale des Wagons-Lits as their second Pullman service between Belgium and France.

Timetable of 1929:

Due to good loading figures the service was extended to Amsterdam on 15 May 1935, making the Oiseau Bleu the "mirror" of the Étoile du Nord. The outbreak of World War II interrupted the service. On 1 June 1947 the train service was restarted on the Paris – Brussels portion, conveying two through coaches from and to Antwerp and Amsterdam. However, by at least 1949, the through coaches to points north of Brussels had been discontinued and the Oiseau Bleu – also called the Blue Bird Express during that era – was again running only Brussels–Paris and return, with first- and second-class Pullman cars.

Trans Europ Express
On 2 June 1957 the Oiseau Bleu was one of the initial services at the start of the Trans Europ Express (TEE) network. Until 31 May 1964 the Oiseau Bleu was part of the joint Dutch–Swiss TEE service provided by RAm-type diesel multiple unit trainsets. The Dutch and Swiss railways scheduled the use of each TEE trainset on a five-day cycle: Day 1 Zürich–Amsterdam (TEE Edelweiss), Day 2 Amsterdam–Paris (TEE Étoile du Nord) in the morning and Paris–Brussels (TEE Oiseau Bleu) in the evening, Day 3 Brussels – Paris (TEE Oiseau Bleu) in the morning and Paris–Amsterdam (TEE Étoile du Nord) in the evening, Day 4 Amsterdam–Zürich (TEE Edelweiss), Day 5 maintenance in Zürich. 

On 31 May 1964 the RAm trainsets were withdrawn from the PBA (Paris–Brussels–Amsterdam) route, and the train became locomotive-hauled.  However, the Inox-PBA-class  coaches planned for use on the Oiseau Bleu were not available until 2 August 1964, so for two months the train was operated with ordinary French first-class coaches and a Wagon-Lits dining car, and then converted to Inox-PBA coaches, which included Wagon-Lits meal service  direct to passengers' seats.  The Oiseau Bleu operated by French and Belgian railways stayed in service until the reorganisation of 1984. On 3 June 1984 the Oiseau Bleu was discontinued.

Timetable of 1971:

References

Works cited

International named passenger trains
Named passenger trains of Belgium
Named passenger trains of France
Named passenger trains of the Netherlands
Trans Europ Express
Railway services introduced in 1929
Railway services discontinued in 1984